Benjamin Doolittle (December 29, 1825 in Lenox, Madison County, New York – February 6, 1895 in Oswego, New York) was an American politician from New York.

Life
He was the son of Francis W. Doolittle and Olive (Lee) Doolittle. In 1847, he removed to Oswego and became a merchant and manufacturer. In 1849, he married Susan Hitchcock (died 1852). On September 20, 1852, he married Laura J. Mayer Rowe (died 1858), and they had three children. On March 23, 1859, he married Roxy Wilcox, and they had six children.

He was a member of the New York State Assembly (Oswego Co., 1st D.) in 1869; and Mayor of Oswego, New York in 1874.

He was a member of the New York State Senate (21st D.) in 1876 and 1877.

Sources
 Benjamin Doolittle at Oswego County Governments
 OBITUARY NOTES; Ex-Senator and ex-Assemblyman Benjamin Doolittle... in NYT on February 7, 1895

1825 births
1895 deaths
Republican Party New York (state) state senators
Politicians from Oswego, New York
Republican Party members of the New York State Assembly
Mayors of places in New York (state)
People from Lenox, New York
19th-century American politicians